For the "Ndembu tribe", see List of Zambian tribes.

 Dembos  is a municipality in Bengo Province in Angola.

References

Populated places in Bengo Province
Municipalities of Angola